Akvilė Paražinskaitė (born 29 November 1996) is a Lithuanian tennis player.

In her career, she won one singles and five doubles titles on the ITF Women's Circuit. On 18 July 2022, she reached her best singles ranking of world No. 491 and her best doubles ranking of No. 356.

Paražinskaitė was attending the University of Kentucky.

Playing for Lithuania Fed Cup team, she has a 13–4 win–loss record in Fed Cup competition.

ITF finals

Singles: 3 (1 title, 2 runner–ups)

Doubles: 10 (5 titles, 5 runner–ups)

References

External links

 
 
 

1996 births
Living people
Sportspeople from Vilnius
Lithuanian female tennis players
Tennis players at the 2014 Summer Youth Olympics
Kentucky Wildcats women's tennis players